Rajeev Suri (born 10 October 1967) is an Indian born Singaporean business executive. He has been the CEO of Inmarsat since February 2021, and was previously the CEO of Nokia until 31 July 2020. Before being appointed Nokia's CEO in May 2014, he was the CEO of Nokia Solutions and Networks from 2009 and held various positions within Nokia since 1995. Suri became the CEO of Nokia when the sale of Nokia's phone division to Microsoft Mobile was completed, replacing Stephen Elop.

Early life
Rajeev Suri was born on 10 October 1967 in New Delhi, India, and was later raised in Kuwait. He is a Singaporean citizen. Suri has a bachelor's of engineering (electronics and communications) from the Manipal Institute of Technology, then affiliated to Mangalore University.

Career
In his more than 20 years of international experience, Rajeev has worked in roles comprising strategy and M&A, product marketing, sales, major account leadership, regional and business unit leadership and has lived in Middle East, Asia, Africa and Europe. He worked for multinational corporations in India and Nigeria, before joining Nokia in 1995.

Suri followed Simon Beresford-Wylie as the CEO of NSN in October 2009 after Nokia Networks and Siemens Networks had been merged. He is considered a 'turnaround specialist' in the global tech circles. 

In November 2011, Suri announced that the company planned to eliminate 17,000 jobs by the end of 2013 to enable NSN to refocus on mobile broadband equipment, the fastest-growing segment of the market. The reductions would slash the company's work force by 23 percent from 74,000. The cuts followed NSN's $1.2 billion purchase of Motorola's mobile network equipment business in July 2010, which added staff; and would help the company trim annual operating expenses by $1.35 billion by the end of 2013.

In April 2014, Suri was appointed as the CEO of Nokia. This was after Nokia had bought back full control of NSN and sold Nokia's phone division to Microsoft Mobile. Suri was the second non-Finnish CEO of Nokia after Stephen Elop.

In March 2020, it was announced that Suri would step down as CEO of Nokia. He was replaced by Pekka Lundmark in August 2020.

On 24 February 2021, Suri was appointed as the CEO of Inmarsat, replacing Rupert Pearce.

Personal life
Rajeev is based between Singapore and London. Suri is married to Nina Alag Suri, a businesswoman, and the founder and CEO of Singaporean startup X0pa.ai, and they have two sons, Ankit and Anish.

References

1967 births
Living people
Nokia people
Indian chief executives
Singaporean people of Punjabi descent
People from New Delhi
Indian expatriates in Nigeria
Indian expatriates in Kuwait
Indian expatriates in Finland
Manipal Academy of Higher Education alumni
Singaporean people of Indian descent
Singaporean chief executives